The 2000–01 World Sevens Series was the second edition of the global circuit for men's national rugby sevens teams, organised by the International Rugby Board. The season ran from November 2000 to June 2001 and consisted of nine tournaments (originally 10 were scheduled, but one was cancelled). 

The series was won by New Zealand, who won six of the nine tournaments. Australia won the other three tournaments, and finished second on the series standings.

Itinerary

Final standings
The points awarded to teams at each event, as well as the overall season totals, are shown in the table below. Points for the event winners are indicated in bold. A zero (0) is recorded in the event column where a team played in a tournament but did not gain any points. A dash (–) is recorded in the event column if a team did not compete at a tournament.

Source: world.rugby (archived)

Tournaments

Durban

Dubai

Wellington

Hong Kong

Shanghai

Kuala Lumpur

Japan

London

Cardiff

 
World Rugby Sevens Series